The red-faced spinetail (Cranioleuca erythrops) is a species of bird in the family Furnariidae. It is found in Colombia, Costa Rica, Ecuador, and Panama. Its natural habitat is subtropical or tropical moist montane forest.

The bird is named for its distinctive rufous cheeks and crown. The wings are also rufous. The back and nape are dark olive-brown, while the rest of the underparts are light olive-brown.

This species often associates with mixed-species flocks.

The red-faced spinetail places bits of grass and other material loosely streaming both above and below the nest chamber to break the shape of the nest and to cause it to resemble random debris without any underlying structure. This is considered as a case of protection of its nest from predators by camouflage or "masquerade".

References

Further reading

External links

 
 
 
 

red-faced spinetail
Birds of Costa Rica
Birds of Panama
Birds of the Colombian Andes
Birds of Ecuador
red-faced spinetail
red-faced spinetail
Taxonomy articles created by Polbot